Carlos Alberto Gats (born 11 December 1969 in Buenos Aires) is a former Argentine athlete specializing in the sprinting events. He twice competed at the Olympic Games, at the 1996 Atlanta Games and 2000 Sydney Games. He is the current national record holder in the 100 and 200 metres outdoors and 200 metres indoors.

Competition record

Personal bests
Outdoor
100 metres – 10.23 (+1.0 m/s) (Lisbon 1998)
200 metres – 20.37 (+0.7 m/s) (Lisbon 1998)
400 metres – 46.46 (Santa Fe 1998)
Indoor
60 metres – 6.78 (Madrid 1999)
200 metres – 21.27 (Valencia 1998)

References

 

1969 births
Living people
Athletes from Buenos Aires
Argentine male sprinters
Olympic athletes of Argentina
Athletes (track and field) at the 1996 Summer Olympics
Athletes (track and field) at the 2000 Summer Olympics
Pan American Games competitors for Argentina
Athletes (track and field) at the 1995 Pan American Games
Athletes (track and field) at the 1999 Pan American Games
World Athletics Championships athletes for Argentina
South American Games gold medalists for Argentina
South American Games silver medalists for Argentina
South American Games bronze medalists for Argentina
South American Games medalists in athletics
Competitors at the 1990 South American Games
Competitors at the 1994 South American Games
Competitors at the 1998 South American Games